Recordings 1994–1997 is a compilation album by Space Needle consisting of mostly previously released material from throughout the bands lifetime.

Track listing
 "Eyes To The World" (Ehrbar) 3:40
 ""Dreams"" (Ehrbar) 2:04
 "Sun Doesn't Love Me" (Ehrbar, Parker) 3:09
 "Before I Lose My Style" (Ehrbar) 5:41
 "Scientific Mapp" (Ehrbar) 4:03
 "Never Lonely Alone" (Ehrbar) 3:57
 "Love Left Us Strangers" (Ehrbar) 3:56
 "Old Spice" (Ehrbar) 3:26
 "Cones and Rods" (Gatland) 2:29
 "Put It On The Glass" (Gatland) 2:53
 "Beers In Heaven" (Ehrbar, Gatland) 4:53
 "(Untitled Duet)" (Ehrbar, Gatland) 2:57
 "One Kind of Lullaby" (Parker) 6:17
 "Where The Fucks My Wallet?" (Ehrbar, Gatland, Parker) 15:37

Personnel
Jud Ehrbar – drums, vocals, keyboards, guitars, percussion
Jeff Gatland – guitars, percussion
Anders Parker – guitars, vocals, drums, percussion

Additional personnel
Max Buckholtz – violin
John Parker – bass, vocals
Adam Lasus – percussion
J. Cox – percussion

Space Needle (band) compilation albums
2006 compilation albums